The Swedish South Company, also known as the Company of New-Sweden (Swedish), was a trading company from Sweden founded in 1626, that supported the trade between Sweden and its colony New Sweden, in North America. The colony was envisioned by its founding father Willem Usselincx; it was to become the first Swedish transoceanic trading project.

In 1649 it lost its monopoly on tobacco granted by the king of Sweden in 1641. In 1655 New Sweden was annexed by New Netherland, this brought an end to the activities of the Swedish South Company, it was dissolved in 1680.

References

External links
Dutch and Swedish Settlements on the Delaware

Chartered companies
New Sweden
Fur trade
Trading companies of Sweden
Exploration of North America
Defunct companies of Sweden
1626 establishments in Sweden
1680 disestablishments in Europe
Trading companies established in the 17th century
Trading companies disestablished in the 17th century